The Roman Catholic Archdiocese of Rosario is an ecclesiastical territory or diocese of the Roman Catholic Church in the southern part of the province of Santa Fe, Argentina, with its mother church, the Basilica Cathedral of Our Lady of the Rosary, located in the city of Rosario. The Archbishop since 22 December 2005 is José Luis Mollaghan and the Auxiliary Bishop was Sergio Fenoy, until he was appointed Bishop of San Miguel the 5 December 2006. The former archbishop Eduardo Mirás served as Apostolic Administrator of the Archdiocese between 22 December 2005 and 18 March 2006, the date that Msgr. Mollaghan was installed.

The Archdiocese has an area of 13,500 km2 and a population of around 1,700,000, with 121 parishes. Its ecclesiastical province includes the departments of Belgrano, General López, Iriondo, Rosario and San Lorenzo, plus almost the whole departments of Caseros and Constitución. It has two suffragan bishops, corresponding to the dioceses of San Nicolás de los Arroyos and Venado Tuerto.

History
The diocese was created by Pope Pius XI through the bull Nobilis Argentinae Nationis Ecclesia on 20 April 1934, along with nine others, citing a lack of sufficient episcopal sees to attend to the population. The first bishop was Antonio Caggiano, who was elevated to the episcopal dignity specifically for this post; at the time he was the General Counselor of the Argentine Catholic Action.

Rosario was raised to archdiocese by Pope Paul VI on 12 August 1963. On 7 October 1966 (day of the Virgin of the Rosary), the pope named Rosario "City of Mary" and elevated the Cathedral to Basilica.

On July 15, 2020, it was revealed that Rosario Bishop Eduardo Martin was criminally charged for attempting to supplant sex abuse investigations against clergy who served in the Archdiocese of Rosario.

Bishops

Ordinaries
 Antonio Caggiano (1935–1959), appointed Archbishop of Buenos Aires (Cardinal in 1946)
 Silvino Martínez (1959–1961)
 Guillermo Bolatti (1963–1982) — first Archbishop of this see
 Jorge Manuel López (1983–1993)
 Eduardo Mirás (1994–2005)
 José Luis Mollaghan (2006–2014), appointed Official of the Congregation for the Doctrine of the Faith
 Eduardo Eliseo Martín (2014–present)

Auxiliary bishops
Carlos María Cafferata (1956-1961), appointed Bishop of San Luis
Francisco Juan Vénnera (1956-1959), appointed Bishop of San Nicolás de los Arroyos
Silvino Martínez (1959-1961), appointed Bishop here
Benito Epifanio Rodríguez (1960-1976)
Jorge Manuel López (1968-1972), appointed Archbishop here
Desiderio Elso Collino (1972), appointed Bishop of Lomas de Zamora
Atilano Vidal Núñez (1972-1985), appointed Bishop of Santa Rosa
Heraldo Camilo A. Barotto (1973-1983)
Oscar Félix Villena (1982-1994)
Mario Luis Bautista Maulión (1986-1995), appointed Bishop of San Nicolás de los Arroyos
Héctor Sabatino Cardelli (1995-1998), appointed Bishop of Concordia
Sergio Alfredo Fenoy, (1999-2006), appointed Bishop of San Miguel
Luis Armando Collazuol (1997-2004), appointed Bishop of Concordia

Other priest of this diocese who became bishop
Damián Gustavo Nannini, appointed Bishop of San Miguel in 2018

See also
 Roman Catholicism in Argentina

References

  Archdiocese of Rosario  at AICA (Argentine Catholic News Agency).

External links
  

Roman Catholic dioceses in Argentina
Roman Catholic Ecclesiastical Province of Rosario
Roman Catholic Archdiocese
Roman Catholic Archdiocese
Christian organizations established in 1934
Roman Catholic dioceses and prelatures established in the 20th century